African-Indian, usually refers to people of mixed Indian and African heritage.
By demographic
Dougla, Caribbean people who are of mixed African and Indian descent.
Members of the Indian diaspora living in Africa and citizens of India living in Africa:
South African Indians
Indian diaspora in Southeast Africa
Indians in Madagascar
Indians in Kenya
Indians in Tanzania
Indians in Uganda
Indians in Mozambique
Indians in Zimbabwe
Indians in Botswana
Indians in Zambia
Mauritians of Indian origin
Réunionnais of Indian origin and Malbars (Réunionnais of Tamil origin)
Indo-Seychellois
Members of the African diaspora living in India:
Siddis, a South Asian community of Bantu descent
Siddis of Karnataka, a Karnataka community of Bantu descent
Afro-Asians in South Asia, South Asian people of African descent

Occasionally, the term "African Indian" may refer to people of mixed African and Indigenous American heritage, such as Zambo people or Black Native Americans in the United States, as "Indian" is also used venerably if colloquially to refer to indigenous people of the Americas.

See also
Afro-Asians
Indo-Caribbeans

Multiracial affairs